Amelia Ignacia Hernández Bonilla (born June 7, 1971), is a Venezuelan chess Women FIDE Master (WFM) (1988), five-times Venezuelan Women's Chess Championships winner (1985, 1986, 1992, 1994, 2018), Women's Chess Olympiad individual gold medalist (1994).

Biography
In 1988, in Aguadilla, Hernández won the World Youth Chess Championship in U18 girl's group. She was awarded the title of FIDE Master (WFM) for this success, becoming the first Venezuelan chess player to receive this title. Hernández five times won Venezuelan Women's Chess Championships: in 1985, 1986, 1992, 1994 and 2018. In 1995, in Willemstad she won the Central American Women's Chess Cup.

Hernández played for Venezuela in the Women's Chess Olympiads:
 In 1988, at first board in the 28th Chess Olympiad (women) in Thessaloniki (+4, =2, -7),
 In 1992, at third board in the 30th Chess Olympiad (women) in Manila (+6, =4, -1),
 In 1994, at third board in the 31st Chess Olympiad (women) in Moscow (+8, =1, -0) and won individual gold medal,
 In 1996, at third board in the 32nd Chess Olympiad (women) in Yerevan (+7, =2, -3),
 In 2018, at second board in the 43rd Chess Olympiad (women) in Batumi (+3, =2, -3). 
 In 2020, Hernández also played the "I World Online Chess Olympiad", as a member of the Venezuelan Olympic team, scoring 4/4 (100%).

In 1996, Hernández graduated from the Valencia University of Carabobo Faculty of Medicine, becoming a Medical Doctor. She made a master's degree, specializing as an Obstetrician-Gynecologist. In 2017 she came back to chess at Aruba Chess Challenge (Orangestaad), where she achieved 4th place, being the only female player. In January 2018 she became Venezuelan Female National Champion (Santo Domingo, Mérida), and joined the Olympic Team again, representing Venezuela at the World Chess Olympiad (Batumi, Republic of Georgia), 2018. Currently, Hernández continues her chess career, she got her FIDE instructor official certification and is focused on coaching, promoting chess in South Florida and teaching chess at Franklin Academy Sunrise. Also, due to her chess player, chess coach and medical career accomplishments, Hernandez is also a current member of FIDE World Medical Commission.

References

External links

Amelia Hernández chess games at 365chess.com
Amelia Hernández la gran leyenda olimpica.

1971 births
Living people
Venezuelan chess players
Chess Woman FIDE Masters
Chess Olympiad competitors
Venezuelan surgeons
Women surgeons